Samuel Gardiner may refer to:

Samuel Gardiner (author) (born 1560s)
Samuel Rawson Gardiner (18291902), historian

See also
Sam Gardiner (disambiguation)
Samuel Gardner (disambiguation)